Stony Brook, Stonybrook or  Stoney Brook may refer to:

Education
 Stony Brook University, a public research university in Stony Brook, New York
Stony Brook Seawolves, the university's athletic programs
Stony Brook University Hospital, a tertiary academic medical center serving Long Island
 The Stony Brook School, a private secondary school in Stony Brook, New York

Places

Communities
 Stoney Brook Township, St. Louis County, Minnesota
 Stony Brook, New York, a hamlet in western Suffolk County on Long Island

Parks and historic sites

Massachusetts
 Stony Brook Air Force Station, a defunct Air Force facility in Ludlow
 Stony Brook Reservation, a state park at the headwaters of Stony Brook, Boston
 Stony Brook Wildlife Sanctuary, Norfolk
 Stony Brook Power Plant, Ludlow. The power plant located on the Stony Brook Air Force Station

Elsewhere
 Stony Brook Meeting House and Cemetery, historic Quaker sites in Princeton, New Jersey
 Stony Brook State Park, in Dansville, New York

Transportation
 Stony Brook station (MBTA), a rapid transit station in Boston, Massachusetts
 Stony Brook station (LIRR), a Long Island Rail Road station in Stony Brook, New York
 Stony Brook station (Boston and Maine Railroad), a former station on the MBTA Fitchburg Line in Weston, Massachusetts
 Shixi station, which can be literally translated as a Stony Brook station, station on Guangfo Line, Guangzhou, China

Waterways

New England, United States
 Stony Brook (Charles River tributary, Boston), empties into the Charles River Basin
 Stony Brook (Merrimack River tributary), northeastern Massachusetts, meets at Chelmsford
 Stony Brook (Charles River tributary, Weston), meets the Charles in Weston
 Stony Brook (Souhegan River tributary), southern New Hampshire

Mid-Atlantic, United States
 Stony Brook (Delaware River), in Warren County, New Jersey
 Stony Brook (Fishing Creek tributary), in Columbia County, Pennsylvania
 Stony Brook (Flat Brook), a tributary of Flat Brook, in Sussex County, New Jersey
 Stony Brook (Green Brook), in central New Jersey
 Stony Brook (Mehoopany Creek), in northeastern Pennsylvania
 Stony Brook (Millstone River), in Mercer County, New Jersey
 Stony Brook (Schoharie Creek tributary), in Schoharie County, New York

See also